is a Japanese manga artist known for her shōjo and boys' love works.

Life
Fumi Yoshinaga was born in Tokyo, Japan in 1971. She discovered amateur manga, doujinshi, in junior high school, when a friend showed her a doujinshi depicting a romantic relationship between two male characters of Captain Tsubasa. While still in school, she hid from others that she was an otaku in order to avoid bullying.

She attended the prestigious Keio University in Tokyo. While at university, she joined a manga club in order to be able to talk to others about manga. When she read the popular manga series Slam Dunk, she was inspired to create a gay love story based on the characters of Kogure and Mitsui. She continued making doujinshi throughout her time as a student and participated in doujinshi conventions.

Her professional career started as an addition to her activities as a doujinshi artist. She made her professional debut as a manga artist in 1994 with The Moon and the Sandals, serialized in the newly-founded Boys' Love magazine Hanaoto. The editor of the magazine was a friend of hers that she had met through doujinshi.

She continued working for Boys' Love magazines, but eventually switched to mainstream magazines, as Boys' Love magazines had policies that artists had to include sex scenes, which she found difficult.

Style and themes 
Most of her romantic works center male-male romance. At a young age, she read shōjo manga depicting homosexuality, such as Patalliro!, Kaze to Ki no Uta and Hi Izuru Tokoro no Tenshi. Yoshinaga explains that she is not passionate about normative romantic storylines: "However, I can easily broaden my imagination as to stories starting from 'comradeships,' 'master-slave' relationships or the kind of friendship that becomes too passionate and then turns into romance." When she creates gay storylines, she keeps in mind that gay people might read them. With her series What Did You Eat Yesterday?, she wanted to depict the daily life of a middle-aged gay couple without focusing on romance, instead putting the difficulties of living together as a couple and cooking at the center of the plot.

In an interview, she said that "I want to show the people who didn't win, whose dreams didn't come true. It is not possible for everybody to get first prize. I want my readers to understand the happiness that people can get from trying hard, going through the process, and getting frustrated."

Outside of her work with Japanese publishers, she also self-publishes original doujinshi on a regular basis, most notably for Antique Bakery. Yoshinaga has also drawn fan parodies of Slam Dunk, Rose of Versailles, and Legend of Galactic Heroes.

She mentions that her favourite operas are those by Mozart in the author's note of Solfege.

Reception 
Of Yoshinaga's many works, several have been licensed internationally. She was also selected and exhibited as one of the "Twenty Major Manga artist Who Contributed to the World of Shōjo Manga (World War II to Present)" for Professor Masami Toku's exhibition, "Shōjo Manga: Girl Power!" at CSU-Chico.

Works

One-shots

Series

Illustrations

Shōnen-ai novels

Miscellaneous
 - A book about the state of manga today by famed manga scholar, Fusanosuke Natsume
 - Mag Garden
 - Mag-Garden
 - New Japanese edition of Denis Diderot's Jacques the Fatalist and his Master
 - Interviews of selected manga artist

Awards

|-
| 2002
| Antique Bakery 
| Kodansha Manga Award (Shōjo)
| 
|
|-
| 2004
| All My Darling Daughters 
| Japan Media Arts Festival
| 
| selected as a Jury Recommended Work (Manga Division)
|-
| 2005
| Ōoku: The Inner Chambers
| Sense of Gender Awards (Special Prize)
| 
| 
|-
| 2006
| Ōoku: The Inner Chambers
| Japan Media Arts Festival (Excellence Award)
| 
| 
|-
| 2007
| Ōoku: The Inner Chambers
| Tezuka Osamu Cultural Prize
| 
| 
|-
| 2007
| Antique Bakery
| Eisner Award (Best U.S. Edition of International Material — Japan)
| 
| English-language translation by Digital Manga Publishing
|-
| 2008
| Flower of Life
| YALSA Great Graphic Novels for Teens
| 
| English-language translation by Digital Manga Publishing
|-
| 2008
| The Moon and the Sandals
| YALSA Great Graphic Novels for Teens
| 
| English-language translation by Digital Manga Publishing
|-
| 2008
| Ōoku: The Inner Chambers
| Manga Taishō
| 
| 
|-
| 2008
| Flower of Life
| Manga Taishō
| 
| 
|-
| 2008
| What Did You Eat Yesterday?
| Manga Taishō
| 
| 
|-
| 2008
| Ōoku: The Inner Chambers 
| Tezuka Osamu Cultural Prize
| 
| 
|-
| 2008
| —
| Eisner Award (Best Writer/Artist).
| 
| 
|-
| 2009
|  Ōoku: The Inner Chambers 
| Tezuka Osamu Cultural Prize (Grand Prize)
| 
| 
|-
| 2009
|  Ōoku: The Inner Chambers 
| James Tiptree, Jr. Award
| 
| English-language translation by Viz Media
|-
| 2010
|  Ōoku: The Inner Chambers 
| YALSA Great Graphic Novels for Teens
| 
| English-language translation by Viz Media
|-
| 2010
|  Ōoku: The Inner Chambers 
| Shogakukan Manga Award (Shōjo)
| 
| 
|-
| 2019
|  What Did You Eat Yesterday? 
| Kodansha Manga Award (General)
| 
|

References

External links
 The Fumi Yoshinaga Resource Index 
 The Japanese Association for Gender Fantasy & Science Fiction - Sense of Gender Award 

 
Women manga artists
Manga artists from Tokyo
Winner of Kodansha Manga Award (Shōjo)
Japanese female comics artists
Living people
People from Tokyo
1971 births
Female comics writers
Keio University alumni